Labrisomus fernandezianus is a species of labrisomid blenny endemic to the Juan Fernández Islands, in the southeastern Pacific Ocean.

References

fernandezianus
Taxa named by Alphonse Guichenot
Fish described in 1848
Endemic fauna of Chile